The Ibicui tuco-tuco (Ctenomys ibicuiensis) is a species of rodent in the family Ctenomyidae. It is endemic to southern Brazil.

References 

Tuco-tucos
Mammals of Brazil
Endemic fauna of Brazil
Mammals described in 2012